Alfred Richard Gotthilf Sormann (May 16, 1861 – September 17, 1913) was a German pianist and composer.

Born in Danzig, Sormann studied at the Hochschule in Berlin under Ernst Rudorff, Karl Heinrich Barth, Philipp Spitta, and Woldemar Bargiel; in 1885 he was a pupil of Franz Liszt. His debut performance was in 1886, and he gave successful concerts in chief German towns. In 1889 he became court pianist to Friedrich Wilhelm, Grand Duke of Mecklenburg-Strelitz. He died in Berlin.

Among his works are the operas Die Sibylle von Tivoli (Berlin, 1902) with the libretto by Adelaide Rosa Schultze Henke (née Zingler, the mother of Harald Schultz-Hencke)   and König Harald (Stettin, 1909); a piano concerto in E minor (opus 7); two string quartets; a piano trio; concert études; and other piano pieces.

References

1861 births
1913 deaths
German opera composers
Male opera composers
German classical pianists
Male classical pianists
Musicians from Gdańsk
People from the Province of Prussia
German male classical composers
19th-century classical pianists
19th-century German musicians
German pianists
German male pianists
19th-century German male musicians